Gerečja Vas is a village in the Municipality of Hajdina in northeastern Slovenia. The area is part of the traditional region of Styria. It is now included with the rest of the municipality in the Drava Statistical Region.

Archaeological excavations near the settlement in 2008 unveiled prehistoric settlement layers.

References

External links
Gerečja Vas on Geopedia

Populated places in the Municipality of Hajdina